Park Joo-hyun (born 11 April 1963) is a South Korean lawyer and politician. She is the incumbent Member of the National Assembly since 2016 and was also one of the co-Presidents of the Minsaeng Party in 2020, serving with Yu Sung-yup.

Career 
Born in Gunsan, Park attended to Jeonju Girls' High School. She owns a bachelor's and master's degree in law from Seoul National University. She also studied education at University of Tampere in Finland.

After qualifying for the bar in 1985, Park worked at the Lawyers for a Democratic Society. In 2003, the President Roh Moo-hyun appointed her as the Senior Secretary to the President for National Participation and served for almost a year.

Prior to the 2016 election, Park was brought into the People's Party and ran 3rd in the party list. In 2018, she declared to quit from the PP along with the other dissidents due to the disagreement of the party's decision to merge with the Bareun Party (BP) (both were later merged into the Bareunmirae Party). She, along with Lee Sang-don and Chang Jung-sook, was planning to join the Party for Democracy and Peace (PDP) but unable to do so as PRs are not allowed to exit from their original parties; if they do so, their parliamentary membership will be automatically revoked. Though the law did not allow her to exit, however, the PDP allowed her to hold party positions with holding Bareunmirae membership. She was shortly considered as the potential candidate for the Governor of North Jeolla that can overcome the matter.

On 9 January 2020, Park declared to not seek re-election in the 2020 election. On 24 February, Park was elected as the co-Presidents of the Minsaeng Party along with Yu Sung-yup.

Park married to Hong Ki-tae and has a son and a daughter. She is a Protestant.

Election results

General elections

References

External links 
 Park Joo-hyun on YouTube
 Park Joo-hyun on Blog

1963 births
Living people
South Korean politicians
20th-century South Korean lawyers
South Korean women lawyers